Sangeet Sharada is an 1899 Marathi Sangeet Natak (Musical play), written and directed by playwright Govind Ballal Deval. The play is considered as the first play in Marathi to showcase the social problems and broke the norms by dealing with the subject of child marriage when dramatic literature in India mainly focused on historical-mythological narrations.

Over the period of time, various stage actors like Bal Gandharva, Vishnupant Pagnis, Bhalchandra Pendharkar have performed the lead role of Sharada. Going with the format of Sangeet Natak, play had more than 50 songs, penned and composed by Govind Ballal Deval himself and music attained a cult status over the period of time.

The play "is considered to be a pioneer in social drama in India" and gained the popularity in such a way that when the Child Marriage Restraint Act, proposed by Haribilas Sarda, also known "Sarda Act", was passed in 1929; it was mistaken to be named after the play as "Sharada Act".

Plot 
Bhujanganath, a geriatric widower, wants to marry one more time so that he can have heir to his property, thus befriends Bhadreshwar Dixit, a middleman, who would help him in finding a young bride. Though a well known person in the village, Dixit finds difficulties in getting a bride for Bhujanganath, as nobody agrees for the proposal because of his old age. Dixit convinces Bhujanganath to visit other villages to search for brides and advises him to behave like a wealthy person, which would make it easier to get a bride for Bhujanganath.

Both along with Kodand, a young orphaned Purohit, visit Gangapur and manage to convince people in the village that Bhujanganath is a rich and young man. Kanchanbhat who wishes to marry his young teenage daughter, Sharada, to a rich person hears about Bhujanganath's arrival in the village. He approaches Dixit with the help of one of his friends, Suvarnashastri and readily accepts the proposal when Dixit proposes  5000 as dowry in marriage. Indirakaku, Kanchanbhat's wife and Sharada's mother, disagrees for the marriage when she learns the truth about Bhujanganath. When Kodand visits Kanchanbhat's house along with Dixit, he opposes the marriage and threatens Dixit and Bhujanganath that he will tell the truth and will also lodge a complaint in the police station as the proposed marriage is planned between an old person and a teenager. Frightened Dixit locks Kodand in the basement.

With Kodand missing, villagers start inquiring about Bhujanganath and Dixit. Sharada, after meeting Bhujanganath in person, opposes for the marriage but her father Kanchanbhat does not pay any heed and starts the preparation for the marriage. With the help of a friend, Kodand manages to escape from the custody.

On the day of marriage, Kodand accompanied by police, reaches the marriage venue and exposes Bhujanganath and Dixit. Police arrests both of them. Sharada runs away from the venue and decides to commit suicide. But Kodand convinces Sharada and proposes her for the marriage. Sharada accepts the proposal and both of them decides to get married.

Characters 
The play had number of characters. Some of them even had songs which were rendered by themselves.

 Bhujanganath (Shrimant): a 75-year-old widower
 Kodand: an orphaned Purohit and male protagonist
 Kanchanbhat: Sharada's father
 Janhavi, Sharayu, Vallari, Mandakini, Triveni and Tunga: Sharada's friends
 Bhadreshwar Dixit: a middleman
 Sharada: a teenager, young bride and female protagonist
 Indirakaku: Sharada's mother
 Jayant: Sharada's younger brother

 Hiranyagarbha (Shyamsundar), Suvarnashastri, Shitikanth, Pushkarbhat, Kaustubh, Upadhyay, Kotwal, Bimbacharya, Vetalik, Ramanandcharya, Jagadguru: villagers and other characters

List of songs 
The play, being a musical, had plenty of songs. All the songs were penned and composed by Govind Ballal Deval.

 Act One

 Act Two

 Act Three

 Act Four

 Act Five

In society 
Prior to staging of Sangeet Sharada, plays with historical and mythological stories were popular in Marathi theater. With a message to abolish child marriage from society, the play became "a pioneer in social drama in India" in 1899. The show gained popularity in such a way that when Child Marriage Restraint Act, also known as "Sarda Act" was passed, it was mistaken to be named after the play as "Sharada Act". Passed on September 28, 1929, the act was proposed by Haribilas Sarda and was actually called so after his surname.

The songs of the drama still remain popular. The song "Mhatara Na Ituka" was used in 2011 Marathi film Balgandharva. Recently in January 2012, a modern version of the play Sangeet Sharada - A Reality Show  was staged in Mumbai. The revived play gave a modern perspective to the play. All songs from the original drama were used; some used the new genre of music in them. The play was staged by employees of Municipal Corporation of Greater Mumbai. In 2011, the play was also transliterated into Braille script.

Incidentally, on 21 December 1909 while the play was being performed at the Vijayanand Natyagruha, Nashik, the then British Collector of Nashik, A. M. T. Jackson was shot dead by the freedom fighter Anant Laxman Kanhere. The play was being performed by Annasaheb Kirloskar's Kirloskar Natak Mandali where the lead role of Sharada was being played by Bal Gandharva.

References

External links 

 Sangeet Sharada: Complete Script
 Songs of the play

Indian plays
1899 plays
History of India in fiction
Marathi-language plays
Sangeet Natak